The 1969 USC Trojans football team represented the University of Southern California (USC) in the 1969 NCAA University Division football season. In their tenth year under head coach John McKay, the Trojans compiled a 10–0–1 record (6–0 against conference opponents), won the Pacific-8 Conference (Pac-8) championship, defeated Michigan in the Rose Bowl, and outscored their opponents 261 to 128. The team was ranked third in the final AP Poll and fourth in the final Coaches Poll.

Jim Jones led the team in passing, completing 88 of 210 passes for 1,230 yards with 13 touchdowns and 10 interceptions.  Clarence Davis led the team in rushing with 297 carries for 1,357 yards and nine touchdowns. Sam Dickerson led the team in receiving with 24 catches for 473 yards and six touchdowns.

Schedule

Rankings

Game summaries

UCLA

Roster

References

USC
USC Trojans football seasons
Pac-12 Conference football champion seasons
Rose Bowl champion seasons
College football undefeated seasons
USC Trojans football